Harsono Tjokroaminoto (born 24 April 1912, in Madiun– 22 April 1992) was an Indonesian political figure leaning non-cooperative with the Netherlands. Harsono is Minister of State for Administrative Improvement and Cleaning in Indonesia. In the Dutch colonial  period he had a career as a teacher and school inspector Kweekschool PSII, PSII region of North Sulawesi. He helped and led various newspapers and magazines Islamic-leaning politics, author of several brochures, especially the character of politics and all Islam's. In the era of Japanese occupation he spent some time working on Domei Jakarta, and had also came to be in captivity of the Kempeitai, for participating in the movement of Indonesian youth who want to knock down the Japanese government. In 1946, he served as deputy Secretary of State in the Natsir Cabinet; and in 1955, he served as deputy prime minister in the Harahap Cabinet.

On the physical revolution, the second son of the national hero Oemar Said Tjokroaminoto and sister of Siti Oetari, the first wife of the first President of the Republic of Indonesia, Sukarno sits as a personal adviser to general Soedirman and joined a guerrilla group with him, then became a member in the Committee for the United States of Indonesia to restore the Unitary Republic of Indonesia, lead goodwill Indonesian mission to the Islamic countries and became president of the Youth Congress of the Islamic world. In 1972-1975 he was appointed ambassador to the Republic of Indonesia to Switzerland; and in 1976-1978 he served as a member of the Supreme Advisory Council.

References

External links
Soebagijo Ilham  Notodidjojo. Harsono Tjokroaminoto: Mengikuti jejak perjuangan sang ayah, 1985
 Rustam Yusuf, Rozali Ishak, Sutrisno Kutoyo. Autobiografi Harsono Tjokroaminoto selaku perintis kemerdekaan

1912 births
1992 deaths
People from Madiun
Ambassadors of Indonesia to Switzerland
Government ministers of Indonesia
Indonesian centenarians
Men centenarians
Tjokroaminoto family